Midnight Madness is a 1918 American silent mystery film directed by Rupert Julian and starring Ruth Clifford, Kenneth Harlan and Harry von Meter.

Cast
 Ruth Clifford as Gertrude Temple
 Kenneth Harlan as Prentice Tiller
 Harry von Meter as Aaron Molitor 
 Claire Du Brey as Lola Montez
 Harry Holden as Simon Temple
 Louis Willoughby as Chevat

References

Bibliography
Ken Wlaschin. Silent Mystery and Detective Movies: A Comprehensive Filmography. McFarland, 2009.

External links
 

1918 films
1918 mystery films
American silent feature films
American mystery films
American black-and-white films
Films directed by Rupert Julian
Universal Pictures films
1910s English-language films
1910s American films
Silent mystery films